Kim Fazackerley (born 16 February 1967) is an Australian former cricketer who played primarily as a right-arm medium fast bowler. She appeared in three Test matches and nine One Day Internationals for Australia between 1992 and 1996. She played domestic cricket for Tasmania, Australian Capital Territory and Queensland.

Fazackerley was the first Tasmanian woman to play for Australia. Her niece, Erin Fazackerley, is also a cricketer, having played in the Women's Big Bash League and the Women's National Cricket League.

References

External links
 
 
 Kim Fazackerley at southernstars.org.au

Living people
1967 births
Cricketers from Hobart
Australia women Test cricketers
Australia women One Day International cricketers
Tasmanian Tigers (women's cricket) cricketers
ACT Meteors cricketers
Queensland Fire cricketers